James W. Hardy III (December 24, 1985 – c. June 7, 2017) was an American football wide receiver. He was drafted by the Buffalo Bills of the National Football League (NFL) in the second round of the 2008 NFL Draft and also played for the Baltimore Ravens. He played college football at Indiana University.

Early life, family and education
James Hardy was born and raised in Fort Wayne, Indiana.

He attended Elmhurst High School where he was a star athlete in football and basketball. He received an athletic scholarship for football at Indiana University.

High school athletics
At Elmhurst High School in Fort Wayne, Indiana, Hardy played football and basketball. As a senior, he posted 34 catches for 710 yards and 10 touchdowns and was a Class 4A all-state selection by the Indiana Football Coaches Association.

As a basketball player, he was runner-up in the Indiana "Mr. Basketball" award voting and an Indiana All-Star. He ranks high on the list for the city scoring record for Fort Wayne, with over 2,000 points during his four years at Elmhurst. Hardy led Elmhurst to a state championship appearance his junior year. However, Elmhurst was defeated by Bishop Chatard High School from Indianapolis. His senior year, he led Elmhurst to a sectional championship, but later was defeated by Bellmont High School in the regional finals.

Hardy was also a two-time winner of the Tiffany Gooden Award, awarded annually to the most outstanding male or female basketball player in the SAC.

College athletics
Hardy redshirted as a true freshman in 2004. As a redshirt freshman in 2005, he posted 61 catches for 893 yards and 10 touchdowns. His play earned him a Freshman All-America selection.

As a sophomore, he caught 51 passes for 722 yards and 10 touchdowns and was named Second-team All-Big Ten for a second straight year. His 20 career receiving touchdowns in his first two years had tied him with Ernie Jones (1984–1987) for second on the university's all-time list, trailing only Jade Butcher (1967–1969) and his 30 career TD grabs.

As a junior, Hardy caught 74 passes for 1,075 yards—ranking third in the Big Ten in both categories—and became the Hoosiers' all-time receiving leader in touchdowns (36), yards (2,690) and receptions (186). He was selected first-team All-Big Ten selection, a Fred Biletnikoff Award semifinalist and the team's most valuable player.

During his time at Indiana, Hardy also played on the basketball team for two years. 

In January 2008, Hardy declared himself eligible for the 2008 NFL Draft, saying "I have reached the pinnacle of my college football career."

Professional athletics
At the NFL Scouting Combine, Hardy was a top 10 performer in the bench press, broad jump, 3-cone drill, and 20-yard shuttle. He finished 7th in the 3-cone drill with a time of 6.84 seconds. He also finished tied for seventh in the 20-yard shuttle with a time of 4.20 seconds. Official 40-yard dash time was 4.49.

Buffalo Bills
Hardy was drafted by the Buffalo Bills in the second round (41st overall) of the 2008 NFL Draft. He signed a multi-year contract with the team on July 24. On September 14, 2008, in his second game, Hardy caught his first touchdown late in a win against the Jacksonville Jaguars. He finished the campaign with nine catches for 87 yards and two touchdowns.

Hardy played in two games in 2009, catching one pass for nine yards. On September 4, 2010, he was released by the Bills.

Baltimore Ravens
On January 17, 2011, Hardy was signed to a reserve/future contract by the Baltimore Ravens. He practiced little with the Ravens during the 2011 training camp due to chronic hamstring problems, the same injury that nagged him while with the Bills. He was released by the Ravens on September 5, 2011.

Post-athletics career
After the NFL, Hardy turned his attention to Hollywood, where he pursued a career in modeling and acting.

Personal problems and death
On May 4, 2014, Hardy was arrested on felony charges following a  dispute at his home in Los Angeles, in which a visibly drugged Hardy attacked police officers responding to a disturbing the peace call. In November 2014, it was reported a judge deemed Hardy unfit for trial and remanded him to a mental facility.

On June 7, 2017, Hardy's body was found lodged in a dam in the Maumee River in Fort Wayne, Indiana. He was 31 years old. On July 18, his death was ruled a suicide, by way of asphyxia from drowning.

References

External links

 Biography at the Buffalo Bills website
 Profile at CSTV.com

1985 births
2017 deaths
2017 suicides
African-American players of American football
American football wide receivers
Arizona Rattlers players
Basketball players from Fort Wayne, Indiana
Baltimore Ravens players
Buffalo Bills players
Indiana Hoosiers football players
Indiana Hoosiers men's basketball players
Players of American football from Fort Wayne, Indiana
Small forwards
Tampa Bay Storm players
American men's basketball players
Suicides by drowning in the United States
Suicides in Indiana
Ed Block Courage Award recipients